Bruce Michael Kimball (born August 19, 1956) is a former American football offensive lineman in the National Football League (NFL) for the New York Giants and the Washington Redskins.  

He played college football at the University of Massachusetts Amherst and was drafted in the seventh round of the 1979 NFL Draft by the Pittsburgh Steelers.  He played for two seasons in the Canadian Football League (CFL) before playing in the NFL.  He was inducted in the UMass Athletic Hall of Fame in 2000.

References

1956 births
Living people
Sportspeople from Beverly, Massachusetts
Players of American football from Massachusetts
American football offensive guards
UMass Minutemen football players
American players of Canadian football
Toronto Argonauts players
New York Giants players
Washington Redskins players